Document Records is an independent record label, founded in Austria and now based in Scotland, that specializes in reissuing vintage blues and jazz. The company has been recognised by The Blues Foundation, being honoured with a Keeping the Blues Alive Award. Document Records is the only UK-based recipient of the award in 2018.

History
Document was established in 1986 by Johnny Parth, the former owner of Roots Records, in Austria to make previously unreleased blues and gospel records from before the 1942–44 musicians' strike available on a number of European labels. In 1990, Parth felt obliged to switch production from LP to CD. With this change, he consolidated the catalogue into complete reissues in chronological order, increasingly on the Document label as other label names were dropped. The new policy was to reissue as many as possible of the recordings listed in the book, Blues and Gospel Records: 1890–1943. The scope was expanded to include bluegrass, spirituals, jazz, and other rural American genres (collectively known as roots music), made between 1900 and 1945. Since 2000 it has been owned by Gary and Gillian Atkinson and is based in Newton Stewart, Scotland.

Document has the exclusive rights to a great deal of unreleased music and other audio media produced by Edison Records between 1914 and 1929.

Artists

 Ora Alexander
 Albert Ammons
 Pink Anderson
 Kokomo Arnold
 Josephine Baker
 Kid Bailey
 Barbecue Bob
 Blue Lu Barker
 Ed Bell
 Gladys Bentley
 Big Maceo
 Esther Bigeou
 Binkley Brothers' Dixie Clodhoppers
 Black Ace
 Francis "Scrapper" Blackwell
 Blind Blake
 Lucille Bogan
 Ishmon Bracey
 Big Bill Broonzy
 Ada Brown
 Bessie Brown
 Cleo Patra Brown
 Gabriel Brown
 Kitty Brown
 Rabbit Brown
 Burnett & Rutherford
 Butterbeans and Susie
 Gus Cannon
 Leroy Carr
 Fiddlin' John Carson
 Alice Leslie Carter
 Bo Carter
 Baby Doo Caston
 Doctor Clayton
 Sam Collins
 Martha Copeland
 Floyd "Dipper Boy" Council
 Ida Cox
 Katie Crippen
 Arthur Crudup
 James Crutchfield
 Leroy Dallas
 Cow Cow Davenport
 Blind Gary Davis
 Blind John Davis
 Madlyn Davis
 Walter Davis
 Georgia Tom Dorsey
 Little Buddy Doyle
 David "Honeyboy" Edwards
 Sleepy John Estes
 William Ezell
 Ethel Finnie
 Fisk University Jubilee Singers
 Baby Face Leroy Foster
 Miss Frankie
 Blind Boy Fuller
 Bill Gaither
 Lawrence Gellert
 Jazz Gillum
 Lillian Glinn
 Lillian Goodner
 Lil Green
 Helen Gross
 Harlem Hamfats
 Kelly Harrell
 Hattie Hart
 Lucille Hegamin
 Rosa Henderson
 Edna Hicks
 Bertha "Chippie" Hill
 King Solomon Hill
 Mattie Hite
 Smokey Hogg
 Lightnin Hopkins
 Son House
 Rosetta Howard
 Peg Leg Howell
 Alberta Hunter
 Mississippi John Hurt
 Bertha Idaho
 Jim Jackson
 New Orleans Willie Jackson
 Skip James
 Frankie "Half-Pint" Jaxon
 Blind Lemon Jefferson
 Monkey Joe
 Bunk Johnson
 Lil Johnson
 Lonnie Johnson
 Margaret Johnson
 Mary Johnson
 Merline Johnson
 Robert Johnson
 Tommy Johnson
 Blind Willie Johnson
 Curtis Jones
 Maggie Jones
 Charley Jordan
 Lottie Kimbrough
 King Solomon Hill
 Rube Lacey
 Lead Belly
 Meade "Lux" Lewis
 Charley Lincoln
 Virginia Liston
 Robert Lockwood, Jr.
 Cripple Clarence Lofton
 Eddie Mapp
 Daisy Martin
 Sara Martin
 Tommy McClennan
 Charlie McCoy
 Kansas Joe McCoy
 Viola McCoy
 Hattie McDaniel
 Charlie "Specks" McFadden
 Barrelhouse Buck McFarland
 Brownie McGhee
 Blind Willie McTell
 Memphis Minnie
 Hazel Meyers
 Josie Miles
 Lizzie Miles
 Mississippi Sheiks
 Little Brother Montgomery
 Monette Moore
 Buddy Moss
 Muddy Waters
 Romeo Nelson
 Reverend A. W. Nix
 Paul Oliver
 Kid Ory
 Pace Jubilee Singers
 Charlie Patton
 Robert Petway
 Joe Pullum
 Ma Rainey
 Fiddlin' Doc Roberts
 Banjo Ikey Robinson
 Elzadie Robinson
 Walter Roland
 Bayless Rose
 Dan Sane
 Irene Scruggs
 Ollie Shepard
 Johnny Shines
 J.D. Short
 Henry "Son" Sims
 Bessie Smith
 Clara Smith
 Laura Smith
 Mamie Smith
 Ruby Smith
 Trixie Smith
 Charlie Spand
 Pinetop Sparks
 Victoria Spivey
 Mary Stafford
 Sunnyland Slim
 Roosevelt Sykes
 Hannah Sylvester
 Blind Joe Taggart
 Tampa Red
 Eva Taylor
 Montana Taylor
 Johnny Temple
 Sonny Terry
 Sister Rosetta Tharpe
 Elvie Thomas
 Henry Thomas
 Hociel Thomas
 Jesse Thomas
 Ramblin' Thomas
 Henry Townsend
 Bessie Tucker
 Blind Willie Walker
 Sippie Wallace
 Wesley Wallace
 Washboard Sam
 Curley Weaver
 Casey Bill Weldon
 Peetie Wheatstraw
 Bukka White
 Georgia White
 Josh White
 Bert Williams
 Big Joe Williams
 Sonny Boy Williamson I
 Sonny Boy Williamson II
 Ralph Willis
 Edith Wilson
 Lena Wilson
 Bill Wyman
 Jimmy Yancey
 Mama Yancey

See also
 List of record labels

References

External links
 Official site
 Document Records Store

Austrian record labels
British record labels
Blues record labels
Jazz record labels
Folk record labels
Reissue record labels
Gospel music record labels
Record labels established in 1990
Record labels established in 2000